Julia Matthews (14 December 1842 – 19 May 1876) was an English-born actress and singer who was popular on the stage, particularly in Melbourne. Matthews was born in London in 1842. She received a marriage proposal from Robert O'Hara Burke shortly before the Burke and Wills expedition. Matthews died aged just 33, in St. Louis, Missouri.

She was played by Greta Scacchi in Burke & Wills (1985) and by Nicole Kidman in Wills & Burke (1985).

It has been claimed that the film actress Jessie Matthews (1907–1981) was a descendant.

References

External links
Portrait at National Portrait Gallery

1842 births
1876 deaths
19th-century Australian actresses
19th-century English actresses
English stage actresses
Australian stage actresses
English emigrants to Australia